The A12 highway is a highway in Lithuania (Magistralinis kelias). It forms part of the road connecting Riga and Kaliningrad (highway E77) Road passes through Joniškis, Šiauliai and Tauragė. The length of the road is 186.09 km.

The speed limit for most of the road length is 90 km/h. There is short 10 km dual-carriageway section south of Šiauliai. The alternative name for the road is Via Hanzeatica as the road was an important transportation corridor between cities of the Hanseatic League, Riga and current-day Kaliningrad.

References

Roads in Lithuania